Paddy Neilan is a Gaelic football referee.

Early life 
He hails from the St Faithleach's club in County Roscommon.

Career 
He refereed the 2017 Munster Senior Football Championship final.  Dublin manager Jim Gavin criticised him after Kerry won.

By 2019 he had refereed in every .county except Waterford, Wexford, and Westmeath. He was referee for the Donegala nd Kerry Super 8s game in the 2019 All-Ireland Senior Football Championship. He is the top referee in Connacht (including Roscommon).

He refereed the 2022 Munster Senior Football Championship semi-final, which Limerick qualified for the final for after twelve years of absence.

Neilan refereed the 2022 All-Ireland Senior Football Championship semi-final between Dublin and Kerry. He did the game without Hawk-Eye because it broke down the day before.

After praise for how he handled the semi-final, Neilan was named as standby referee and linesman for the 2022 All-Ireland Senior Football Championship Final.

Personal life 
He is an electrician in Sligo. He married Carol and, as of 2019, was a father of two, living in the Ballyleague area of Roscommon.

References

Year of birth missing (living people)
Living people
Gaelic football referees
Irish electricians
Place of birth missing (living people)